Sultan Mohammed Esmail Kiram was a Sultan of Sulu. He ruled from 1950 to 1974.

Personal life 
He was the eldest son of Raja Muda Muwallil Wasit II and Mora Napsa. He became the legally recognized successor of the Sultan of Sulu upon his father's death.

History 
The Sultan granted authority to the Philippine government under the administration of President Diosdado Macapagal in 1962. In 1969, he met with President Ferdinand Marcos. The Philippine government officially recognized the continued existence of the Sulu Sultanate and the office of Sultan of Sulu. His eldest son, Mohammed Mahakuttah Abdullah Kiram, became his Raja Muda (Crown Prince).

In 1974, Mohammed Esmail died and was duly succeeded by Mahakuttah. The accession of the new Sultan was recognized by the Filipino President, under whose act Manila acknowledged the personal status of the Sultan-King and the formation of the government of Sulu. Mahakuttah's son and heir Muedzul Lail Tan Kiram became the Raja Muda.

References

External links
 Line of Succession of the Sultans of Sulu of the Modern Era, published by the Official Gazette of the Government of the Philippines  

Sultans of Sulu
1950 births
1974 deaths
People from Sulu